Tetracyanomethane or carbon tetracyanide is a percyanoalkane molecular carbon nitride with formula C(CN)4. The structure can be considered as methane with all hydrogen atoms replaced by cyanide groups. It was first made by Erwin Mayer in 1969.

Properties
Tetracyanomethane is a solid at room temperature. It decomposes over 160 °C without melting, and although it can be in a dilute vapour, no liquid form is known.
The molecules of tetracyanomethane have a tetrahedral symmetry (3m or Td). The molecule has C-C distance of 1.484 Å and C-N distance of 1.161 Å in the gas form. In the solid the C≡N bond shortens to 1.147 Å. The C-C bond has a force constant of 4.86×105 dyn/cm which is slightly greater than the C-Cl bond in carbon tetrachloride, but a fair bit weaker than in the tricyanomethanide ion. At pressures over 7 GPa tetracyanomethane starts to polymerize to form a disorganised covalent network solid. At higher pressure the colour yellows and darkens to black. Over 20 GPa the polymerization is total.

The bulk modulus K0 = 4.4 and its derivative K0' = 18.

Production
Tetracyanomethane can be made by reacting cyanogen chloride with silver tricyanomethanide.

ClCN + AgC(CN)3 → C(CN)4 + AgCl

Reactions
In an acid solution in water tetracyanomethane is hydrolysed to yield tricyanomethanide and ammonium ions along with carbon dioxide. In alkaline solutions tricyanomethanide and cyanate ions are produced.

See also
Tricyanomethane (cyanoform)

References

Nitriles